The 1986 Rothmans Grand Prix was a professional ranking snooker tournament that took place from 18 to 26 October 1986 at the Hexagon Theatre in Reading.

Rex Williams made his first (and only) major final in a professional snooker tournament after being a professional since 1951. He was 53 years and 98 days old, making him the oldest player in a ranking final. He had beaten Jim Bear, Mark Wildman, Alex Higgins, Steve Davis and Neal Foulds before facing Jimmy White in the final. During that match Williams took a 5–2 lead which he had made a break of 125 in the 7th frame and 6–4 before White took the last 6 frames to win his first Grand Prix title by 10–6. White had beaten 17-year-old Stephen Hendry in the quarter-finals and Silvino Francisco in the semi-final.

Main draw

Final

References

1986
Grand Prix
Grand Prix (snooker)